Eel River Township is one of twenty townships in Allen County, Indiana, United States. As of the 2010 census, its population was 3,612.

Geography

Cities, towns, villages
 Huntertown (west edge)

Unincorporated towns
 Ari at 
(This list is based on USGS data and may include former settlements.)

Adjacent townships
 Swan Township, Noble County (north)
 Butler Township, DeKalb County (northeast)
 Perry Township (east)
 Washington Township (southeast)
 Lake Township (south)
 Smith Township, Whitley County (west)
 Green Township, Noble County (northwest)

Cemeteries
The township contains these four cemeteries: Eel River, Fairview, Riverview and Watterson.

Major highways

Lakes
 Fulk Lake
 White Lake

School districts
 Northwest Allen County Schools

Political districts
 Indiana's 3rd congressional district
 State House District 83
 State Senate District 17

References

Citations

Sources
 United States Census Bureau 2008 TIGER/Line Shapefiles
 United States Board on Geographic Names (GNIS)
 IndianaMap

Townships in Allen County, Indiana
Fort Wayne, IN Metropolitan Statistical Area
Townships in Indiana